Stenostola alboscutellata is a species of beetle in the family Cerambycidae. It was described by Kraatz in 1862. It is known from Greece.

References

Saperdini
Beetles described in 1862